Vukov sabor, also known as Vuk's Convocation or Vuk's Fair, is the oldest and most massive cultural event in Serbia. It was named after the reformer of the Serbian language Vuk Karadžić. The central program is traditionally held in September in Vuk's birthplace Tršić, near Loznica. Part of the program is realized in Loznica, Belgrade and the nearby Tronoša Monastery.

The manifestation was registered in the National Registrar of Intangible Cultural Heritage of Serbia on June 18, 2012.

History 

The first Vukov sabor was held in 1933 and, in following years, Vukov sabor wasn't held only in 1941 and 1944 due to World War II.

Organizers 

Organizers of Vukov sabor are Vuk Karadžić Cultural Center, the city of Loznica, and Serbian Ministry of Culture and Information.

References

External links 
 

Loznica
Serbian culture